Live with Kelly and Ryan is the 2017–present title of a long-running American syndicated morning talk show. Kelly Ripa and Ryan Seacrest are the hosts in that period.

Season 29 (2017)

May 2017

June 2017

July 2017

August 2017

Season 30 (2017–2018)

September 2017

October 2017

November 2017

December 2017

January 2018

February 2018

March 2018

April 2018

May 2018

June 2018

July 2018

August 2018

Season 31 (2018–2019)

September 2018

October 2018

November 2018

December 2018

January 2019

February 2019

March 2019

April 2019

May 2019

June 2019

July 2019

August 2019

Season 32 (2019–2020)

September 2019

October 2019

November 2019

December 2019

January 2020

February 2020

March 2020

April 2020

May 2020

June 2020

July 2020

August 2020

Season 33 (2020–2021)

September 2020

October 2020

November 2020

December 2020

January 2021

February 2021

March 2021

April 2021

May 2021

June 2021

July 2021

August 2021

Season 34 (2021–2022)

September 2021

October 2021

November 2021

December 2021

January 2022

February 2022

March 2022

April 2022

May 2022

June 2022

July 2022

August 2022

Season 35 (2022–)

September 2022

October 2022

November 2022

December 2022

January 2023

February 2023

March 2023

References

Lists of American non-fiction television series episodes